Karfaleh or Karfeleh or Kerfeleh or Karfelah may refer to:

Karfelah, Kermanshah
Karfaleh, Lorestan
Karfaleh-ye Lavan, Lorestan Province
Karfeleh-ye Imanabad, Lorestan Province